Fernando Henrique da Conceição, known as Fernandinho, Fernando Henrique or Fei Nanduo (born 16 March 1993), is a professional footballer who last played as a winger for Chinese Super League club Guangzhou.

Born in Brazil, he obtained Chinese citizenship through naturalization.

Club career
Fernandinho began his professional career with his local lower league side Atlético Sorocaba after graduating from their youth team. After playing in several games he was bought by sports marketing company Traffic and trained with top tier club Flamengo who decided to buy 70% of the economic rights of the player. On 15 August 2012 the manager Dorival Júnior decided to give Fernando his debut for the club in a league game against Palmeiras where he came on as a substitute for Thomás Jaguaribe in a game that ended in a 1-0 defeat. The following season Mano Menezes became the manager of the team and decided to give him a run of games and a new name of just Fernando. 

At the start of the 2014 league season it was decided that Fernando needed regular playing time and he joined third tier club Madureira. He would soon join top tier Portuguese team Estoril Praia soon afterwards before going on loan to struggling top tier Chinese side Chongqing Lifan. The move would see Chongqing avoid relegation and Fernando was offered a permanent four year contract with the club. After four seasons with the club Fernando was sold to another top tier Chinese club in Guangzhou Evergrande Taobao who immediately loaned him out to Hebei China Fortune.

Career statistics
Updated to 1 December 2020.

See also 
List of Chinese naturalized footballers

References

External links
 
 

1993 births
Living people
Footballers from São Paulo
Association football forwards
Chinese footballers
Brazilian footballers
Brazilian emigrants to China
Brazilian expatriate footballers
Clube Atlético Sorocaba players
CR Flamengo footballers
Madureira Esporte Clube players
G.D. Estoril Praia players
Chongqing Liangjiang Athletic F.C. players
Hebei F.C. players
Guangzhou F.C. players
Campeonato Brasileiro Série A players
Primeira Liga players
Chinese Super League players
Expatriate footballers in Portugal
Expatriate footballers in China
Brazilian expatriate sportspeople in China
Naturalized citizens of the People's Republic of China